Mesorhizobium silamurunense is a bacterium from the genus Mesorhizobium which was isolated in China.

References

External links
Type strain of Mesorhizobium silamurunense at BacDive -  the Bacterial Diversity Metadatabase

Phyllobacteriaceae
Bacteria described in 2012